Oleksandr Yakovych Oksanchenko (26 April 1968 – 25 February 2022), nicknamed the Grey Wolf, was a Ukrainian fighter pilot and Myrhorod city councilor. He was a colonel in the Ukrainian Air Force who won awards in several air shows before retiring in 2018. In 2022, he returned to serve in the Russian invasion of Ukraine, and was killed by a Russian S-400 missile during the Battle of Kyiv. He was posthumously awarded the Order of Gold Star.

Early life
He graduated from Kharkiv Higher Military Aviation School of Pilots.

Career 
Oksanchenko joined the Soviet Air Force in 1989. He worked as an instructor pilot, later rising to the position of deputy commander of his flight training military unit in the 831st Tactical Aviation Brigade stationed at the Myrhorod Air Base. During the 2014 Crimean crisis, he was stationed at Belbek Air Base and was in combat in Crimea and the Anti-Terrorist Operation Zone.

From 2013 to 2018, Oksanchenko was a display pilot of the Sukhoi Su-27 for the Ukrainian Air Force. He had over 2,000 flying hours. In 2016, he flew in the Malta International Airshow. He was the winner of the 2016  and was presented with a trophy from the Slovak Air Force commander. In 2016, Oksanchenko was honored as the Myrhorod person of the year. In 2017, he won the As the Crow Flies Award for the best display at the Royal International Air Tattoo. Oksanchenko was a colonel when he retired in 2018.

He was a member of the Strength and Honor party in Poltava Oblast. Starting in November 2020, he served as one of the deputies in the Myrhorod city council.

Oksanchenko came out of retirement to resume active duty during the 2022 Russian invasion of Ukraine. On the night of 25 February, he was killed in a friendly fire incident while deflecting hostile planes over Kyiv. Oksanchenko was a recipient of the Order of Danylo Halytsky. He was posthumously awarded the Order of Gold Star by Ukrainian president Volodymyr Zelenskyy.

Personal life 
Oksanchenko had two daughters.

See also
 Ghost of Kyiv

References

External links 
 

1968 births
2022 deaths
Aviators killed by being shot down
Ivan Kozhedub National Air Force University alumni
People from Dnipropetrovsk Oblast
Recipients of the Order of Danylo Halytsky
Recipients of the Order of Gold Star (Ukraine)
Ukrainian Air Force officers
Ukrainian city councillors
Ukrainian colonels
Ukrainian military personnel killed in the 2022 Russian invasion of Ukraine